FK Turbina Jablanica is a professional association football club from the town of Jablanica that is situated in Bosnia and Herzegovina.

Turbina competes in the Second League of the Federation of Bosnia and Herzegovina - South, the third tier in the Bosnia and Herzegovina football league system. The club plays its home matches on the Jablanica City stadium, which has a capacity of 2,000 seats.

Honours

Domestic

League
Second League of the Federation of Bosnia and Herzegovina:
Winners (1): 2013–14

References

External links
FK Turbina Jablanica at Facebook

Turbina Jablanica
Association football clubs established in 1947
Sport in the Federation of Bosnia and Herzegovina
1947 establishments in Bosnia and Herzegovina